In linear algebra, the minimal polynomial  of an  matrix  over a field  is the monic polynomial  over  of least degree such that .

The following three statements are equivalent:
  is an eigenvalue of matrix .

In other words, increasing the exponent up to  will give ever larger kernels, but further increasing the exponent beyond  will just give the same kernel.

For irreducible polynomials  one has similar equivalences:
  divides ,
  divides ,
 the kernel of  has dimension at least .
 the kernel of  has dimension at least .

Like the characteristic polynomial, the minimal polynomial does not depend on the base field. In other words, considering the matrix as one with coefficients in a larger field does not change the minimal polynomial. The reason for this differs from the case with the characteristic polynomial (where it is immediate from the definition of determinants), namely by the fact that the minimal polynomial is determined by the relations of linear dependence between the powers of : extending the base field will not introduce any new such relations (nor of course will it remove existing ones).

The minimal polynomial is often the same as the characteristic polynomial, but not always. The minimal polynomial always divides the characteristic polynomial, which is one way of formulating the Cayley–Hamilton theorem (for the case of matrices over a field).

Formal definition 
Given an endomorphism  on a finite-dimensional vector space  over a field , let  be the set defined as 

A particular choice among the generators can be made, since precisely one of the generators is monic. The minimal polynomial is thus defined to be the monic polynomial which generates .

Applications 
An endomorphism  of a finite-dimensional vector space over a field  is diagonalizable if and only if its minimal polynomial factors completely over  into distinct linear factors. In particular one has:

 : finite order endomorphisms of complex vector spaces are diagonalizable. This is a part of representation theory of cyclic groups.
 By contrast if   with  then  (a nilpotent endomorphism) is not necessarily diagonalizable, since  has a repeated root .

These cases can also be proved directly, but the minimal polynomial gives a unified perspective and proof.

Computation 
For a vector  in  define:

This definition satisfies the properties of a proper ideal. Let  be the monic polynomial which generates it.

Properties

Example 

Taking the first canonical basis vector  and its repeated images by  one obtains

The last one then necessarily is a linear combination of the first three, in fact

, 

so that: 

.

This is in fact also the minimal polynomial  and the characteristic polynomial &hairsp;: indeed  divides  which divides , and since the first and last are of degree  and all are monic, they must all be the same. Indeed one verifies for the full matrix that  is the zero matrix:

References

 

Matrix theory
Polynomials